is a railway station on the Hokuriku Railroad Ishikawa Line in the city of Nonoichi, Ishikawa, Japan, operated by the private railway operator Hokuriku Railroad (Hokutetsu).

Lines

Station layout
The station consists of one side platform serving a single bi-directional track. The station is unattended.

Adjacent stations

History
Nonoichi Station opened on 1 December 1916.

Surrounding area
 Old Hokuriku Highway
 
 Nonoichi Public Library
 Nonoichi Municipal Chuo Nursery

See also
 List of railway stations in Japan

References

External links

 Nonoichi Station information 

Railway stations in Ishikawa Prefecture
Railway stations in Japan opened in 1916
Hokuriku Railroad Ishikawa Line
Nonoichi, Ishikawa